The Barbed Wire Act 1893 (56 & 57 Vict. c. 32) was an Act of the Parliament of the United Kingdom.

It provided that where barbed wire was placed adjoining a highway in such a manner as to which pose a danger to people or animals using the highway, then the local authority was empowered to demand its removal; if the owner of the wire failed to remove it, they could apply for a court order, and if this failed they were empowered to remove it themselves and charge any expenses to the owner.

The Act has since been repealed by various legislation, predominantly by the Highways Act 1959.  And most recently, by Section 164 of the Highways Act 1980.

References

United Kingdom Acts of Parliament 1893
Repealed United Kingdom Acts of Parliament